"Entends-tu le monde?" is the first single released from 7 vies, the second French-language album by Australian singer Tina Arena. The title roughly translates into English as "Do you hear the world?". The music video for the song was directed by Fabien Dulfils in and around Sydney in December and premiered in early January. The song received a physical release as a CD single in France on 11 February 2008.

Song information
The track has a similar musical style to that found on Arena's previous album Un autre univers with its Senegalese choir and Persian guitars. These eastern influences were particularly prominent on the singles "Je m'appelle Bagdad" and "Aimer jusqu'à l'impossible". Lyrically, the song presents a message of hope for the future.

Senegalese singer Thione Seck originally composed the song and the French lyrics were written by Audrey Siourd. The track was produced by Un Chat who is also known as DJ Molecule.

Track listing
"Entends-tu le monde?" (radio edit) (Seck) – 3:33
"Ailleurs" (Tina Arena, Paul Begaud, Vanessa Corish) – 3:57

Release history

Charts

References

2007 singles
French-language songs
French pop songs
Tina Arena songs
2007 songs
Columbia Records singles